The 1956 Cork Intermediate Hurling Championship was the 47th staging of the Cork Intermediate Hurling Championship since its establishment by the Cork County Board in 1909.

Glen Rovers won the championship following a 1-11 to 1-03 defeat of Carrigaline in the final. This was their third championship title overall and their first title since 1954.

References

Cork Intermediate Hurling Championship
Cork Intermediate Hurling Championship